Lembata is an island in the Lesser Sunda Islands, also known as Lomblen island; it is the largest island of the Solor Archipelago, in the Lesser Sunda Islands, Indonesia. It forms a separate regency of the province of Nusa Tenggara Timur. The length of the island is about 80 km from the southwest to the northeast and the width is about 30 km from the west to the east. It rises to a height of 1,533 metres.

To the west lie the other islands in the archipelago, most notably Solor and Adonara, and then the larger island of Flores. To the east is the Alor Strait, which separates this archipelago from the Alor Archipelago. To the south across the Savu Sea lies the island of Timor, while to the north the western branch of the Banda Sea separates it from Buton and the other islands of Southeast Sulawesi.

Administration

The Lembata Regency includes the island of Lembata and three small offshore islands. It is sub-divided into nine districts.

Geography 

The capital city Lewoleba (also known as Labala) is found on the western part of the island next to a bay, across which lies Lewotolo volcano to the north. Ships frequently connect the coastal towns and surrounding islands, but the only bigger harbour exists at Lewoleba in the north of the island. From Lewoleba there are daily connections to Larantuka, Flores, and Waiwerang on the neighbouring island of Adonara.

Like the other Lesser Sunda Islands, and indeed much of Indonesia, Lembata is volcanically active. It has three volcanoes, Ililabalekan, Iliwerung, and Lewotolo.

History 
The south part of Lembata was the site of the state of Labala.

People 
The people of Lembata are, like many other inhabitants of Eastern Indonesia, famous for their handmade ikat weavings.

The national language, Indonesian, is known by many people of all ages, but like on other islands the national language coexists with many local languages. The most widespread and most widely understood of these is probably Lamaholot (another lingua franca inside the Solor archipelago). Lamaholot is spoken as a native language on Eastern Flores and Western Solor, and is itself divided into ten or more sublanguages (and many more dialects). It is spoken by 150.000 or more people in the region. Some of those sublanguages are indeed very distinct from Lamaholot, i.e. the Atadei language of Atadei District (Kecamatan Atadei), which again is subclassified as Eastern and Western Atadei, the former being spoken in Atalojo for example, the latter in Kalikasa. A very distinct language spoken in the eastern part of the island is Kedang.

On the south coast of Lembata, the village of Lamalera (pop. 2,500) is known for its hunting of sperm whale and other deep-sea species. The hunting has been taking place for at least six centuries, and is allowed under International Whaling Commission regulations concerning aboriginal whaling. However, conservationists worry that commercial whaling also takes place, and that hunters use their engine-powered boats all year round to catch other protected species such as manta rays, orcas (Orcinus orca), dolphins and oceanic sharks. Lamalera and Lamakera (on the neighbouring island of Solor) are the last two remaining Indonesian whaling communities.

Environment
In 2011, the Indonesian Institute of Sciences (LIPI) found two rare coral reef fish in the sea of Lamalera, they were Yellow-fin fairy wrasse (Cirrhilabrus flavidorsalis) and swallowtail hawkfish (Cyprinocirrhites polyactis), which only exist in waters surrounding Indonesia and the Philippines.

The two species were the first to be found in Lamalera Sea, but similar types have been found near Bali before. The fish were only found in seas with good coral reefs, although traces of bombing had been found around the coral reefs in the Lamalera Sea, but it was not serious yet.

In February 2016, a new species of flasher wrasse, Paracheilinus alfiani, was described from a holotype collected from the reef around Lembata.

References

External links
 https://web.archive.org/web/20060319135707/http://www.findarticles.com/p/articles/mi_m1134/is_8_110/ai_79051531

Solor Archipelago
Populated places in Indonesia
Islands of Indonesia

id:Kabupaten Lembata
jv:Kabupatèn Lembata
ms:Kabupaten Lembata